Cell unroofing is any of various methods to isolate and expose the cell membrane of cells. Differently from the more common membrane extraction protocols performed with multiple steps of centrifugation (which goal is to separate the membrane fraction from a cell lysate), in cell unroofing the aim is to tear and preserve patches of the plasma membrane in order to perform in situ experiments using (microscopy and biomedical spectroscopy).

History
The first observation the bi-layer cell membrane was made in 1959  on a section of a cell using the electron microscope.
But the first micrograph of the internal side of a cell dates back to 1977 by M.V. Nermut. Professor John Heuser made substantial contributions in the field, imaging the detailed internal structure of the membrane and the cytoskeleton bound to it with extensive use of the electron microscope. 

It was only after the development of the atomic force microscope operated in liquid that it was possible to image the cell membranes in almost-physiological conditions and to test its mechanical properties.

Methods 

 Freeze-fracturing of monolayers
Quick-freeze deep-etch electron microscopy and cryofixation
 Sonication for atomic force microscopy
 Single-cell unroofing

See also
 Sonoporation
Lysis

References 

Cell biology
Scientific techniques